Jack Cowan (6 June 1927 – 10 December 2000) was a Canadian association football player who won championships in both Canada and Scotland. He won the Scottish League Cup with Dundee in 1951–52 (also playing on the losing side in the final of that season's Scottish Cup), then capped off his career by winning Canada Soccer's Carling Cup with Vancouver Hale-Co FC. He was inducted into the Canada Soccer Hall of Fame as a player in 2000.

While attending the University of British Columbia, Cowan made his Pacific Coast League in 1947–48 with Vancouver St. Saviours. He again played for the team in 1948-49 (renamed Vancouver City FC) and was selected to the British Columbia All-Stars at year's end.

After five seasons in Scotland, Cowan returned to Canada to start his engineering career. He also rejoined Vancouver City FC, who in 1955-56 were renamed Vancouver Hale-Co FC. In 1956, he helps his club with the national title. He played in several all-star matches, including representative teams for British Columbia, Western Canada, and Canada. He played one match for Canada, an exhibition match against FC Lokomotiv Moscow on 18 August 1956.

Cowan retired from soccer after the 1956 season at age twenty-nine.

References

External links
 / Canada Soccer Hall of Fame
Newcastle Fans profile

1927 births
2000 deaths
Soccer players from Vancouver
Canadian expatriate soccer players
Canadian expatriate sportspeople in Scotland
Canada Soccer Hall of Fame inductees
Canadian soccer players
Canadian people of British descent
Dundee F.C. players
Expatriate footballers in Scotland
Association football defenders
Scottish Football League players
UBC Thunderbirds soccer players
Vancouver City S.C. players
Vancouver Halecos players